Torture in Bahrain refers to the violation of Bahrain's obligations as a state party to the United Nations Convention against Torture and Other Cruel, Inhuman or Degrading Treatment or Punishment (Convention against Torture) and other international treaties and disregard for the prohibition of torture enshrined in Bahraini law.

Torture was routine practice in Bahrain between 1975 and 1999, during the period when the State Security Act 1974 was in force. Individuals have been tortured after being detained at demonstrations and public gatherings. On 17 December 2007 on Martyrs' Day, commemorating past victims of torture, the Special Security Forces began a wave of arrests targeting more than 60 persons, among them over ten activists. During February 2009, several key human rights defenders in Bahrain were arbitrarily arrested and detained.

The issue of immunity for past violations has also been a continuing concern. In 2001, Hamad bin Isa Al Khalifa pardoned all those involved in the political violence of the 1990s, freeing hundreds of prisoners. In 2002 Royal Decree 56 established the clarification that amnesty was also granted to all state security officers who may have committed human rights abuses prior to 2001. In 2005 the United Nations Committee against Torture, expressing concern over the failure to investigate allegations and a pattern of impunity for torturers, referred specifically to the Decree 56 amnesty. Nevertheless, the Decree has not been amended.

The State Security Act era
Torture was particularly endemic in Bahrain between 1974 and 1999, when the State Security Act 1974 was in force prior to the accession of King Hamad. The Act, formally scrapped in 2001, contained measures permitting the government to arrest and imprison individuals without trial for up to three years for crimes relating to state security. Other measures associated with the 1974 Act, such as the establishment of State Security Courts, added to the conditions conducive to the practice of torture.

Torture appears to have been most prevalent during the 1990s Uprising, between 1994 and 1997 when demands for the return of the liberal Constitution of 1973 and Parliamentary were made in two public petitions to the Emir. Individuals associated with the petitions were deemed to be acting against the regime and detained under the State Security Laws, subjected to torture and in some cases forced into exile.

Bahrain's track record of gross violations of human rights and torture has been raised on numerous occasions in various UN fora.  Bahrain was one of the countries subjected to the UNHCHR 1503 procedure and has been the subject of a resolution by the Sub-Commission on Prevention of Discrimination and Protection of Minorities and urgent appeals from the Special Rapporteur on Torture and the Working Group on Arbitrary Detention. The Special Rapporteur summed up the practice of torture during this period in his 1997 report to the UN Human Rights Commission:

Repeal of the State Security Law

After the Emir Sheikh Hamad bin Isa Al Khalifa succeeded his father Sheikh Isa Bin Sulman Al Khalifa in 1999, the use of torture appeared to decline dramatically. Only isolated incidents were reported and conditions of detention improved. This was attributed to the introduction of crucial reforms. In October 2001, the Working Group on Arbitrary Detention visited Bahrain for the first time. Although it confirmed the condemnatory decisions and opinions it had previously made in relation to the state security laws with further investigations, it congratulated Bahrain on "the decisive scale and scope of the reforms that have been undertaken and the accompanying acts of clemency" following the repeal of the State Security laws and the release of political prisoners. It viewed the repeal of the state security laws as amounting to "a major political shift in favour of human rights". It also noted: "Not all the instruments currently in force are flawed, the problem lies rather in their practical application." Much depended on the willingness of the authorities to pursue the reform process and ensure that existing safeguards were effectively implemented in practice.

The royally-appointed Prime Minister, Shaikh Khalifah ibn Sulman al-Khalifah (uncle of the present King), head of government throughout the period when torture has been alleged to have taken place, continued in office until his death in 2020. Among individuals alleged to have committed, or overseen, torture are: Ian Henderson, Adel Flaifel, Khalid Al Wazzan, Abdulla Al Dowsari Sheikh Abdulaziz Ateyatallah Al-Khalifa, Alistair Bain McNutt. In March 2000, King Hamad awarded several of the accused torturers with the Order of Shaikh Isa bin Salman Al Khalifa medal.

Decree 56 of 2002

The state's obligation to provide an effective remedy and the need for torture survivors to receive compensation and other forms of reparation was stressed by the United Nations Working Group on Arbitrary Detention. The views of civil society have also emphasised the need for effective and enforceable remedies for torture.

No alleged perpetrator has been tried for torture or ill treatment despite the practice of torture in Bahrain during the 1980s and 1990s being well documented. In one case in 2001, an individual who suffered torture while in police custody was reported to have been personally compensated by the Emir. In November 2002, 8 torture victims lodged complaints relating to their treatment with the Directorate of Public Prosecutions requesting effective investigation and the prosecution of one of the alleged perpetrators, Adel Felaifel, who was already being investigated on relation to fraud and embezzlement charges. There have been numerous demonstrations and calls from the public for such a prosecution to be initiated. Nevertheless, no formal investigation of these cases has been reported and calls for the investigation and prosecution of such crimes has been met with stiff opposition from the Government.

Decree 56 of 2002, which purports to grant a blanket amnesty for any case (civil or criminal) lodged by persons accused of or convicted of "offences that endangered or pose a threat to state/national security" which fell within the jurisdiction of the State Security Court, effectively extends Decree 10/2001, the general amnesty of February 2001, to cover human rights violations committed by government and security officials as well as offences by political opponents of the government. It is direct contravention of the provision of Article 89 of the Penal Code that only allows amnesty laws which do "not affect third party rights", and contrary to the prohibition of torture by the National Charter, which provides that:

Despite petitions to the King to repeal Decree, it remains in force.

UN Committee against Torture's
At its 34th session in 2005, the UN Committee against Torture noted the failure of Bahrain to investigate allegations and a pattern of impunity for torturers, including the Decree 56 amnesty. In its concluding observations the Committee listed amongst its subjects of concern:

The Committee recommended, inter alia, that Bahrain:

Revival of the use of torture after 2007
A Human Rights Watch (HRW) report, "Torture Redux: The Revival of Physical Coercion during Interrogations in Bahrain", published in February 2010, concluded that although serious and systemic reports of torture and other ill-treatment in detention in Bahrain that were routine between 1975 and 1999 had become rare after 1999 (although serious abuse by security forces during arrests continued), reports of the use of torture and ill-treatment increased again after the end of 2007, coinciding with rising political tension and street demonstrations against discrimination against members of the majority Shi'a community. HRW found that government officials appeared to be using a "repertoire" of techniques to cause pain and elicit confessions from security suspects.  These included "the use of electro-shock devices, suspension in painful positions, beating the soles of the feet (falaka), and beatings of the head, torso, and limbs", as well as threats to kill detainees or rape them or members of their families, in violation of Bahrain's obligations as a state party to the United Nations Convention Against Torture and Other Cruel, Inhuman or Degrading Treatment or Punishment (Convention Against Torture) and other international treaties and as the prohibition of torture in Bahraini law.

During opposition street protests in Shi'a neighbourhoods and villages around Manama in December 2007 a protester was allegedly asphyxiated by tear gas and confrontations, provoking further confrontations with security forces. Following an incident in the village of Jidhafs Bahraini human rights activists reported claims by detainees of severe beatings, electric shock, prolonged suspension in painful positions and other forms of abuse amounting to torture or other illegal treatment.  These claims were officially denied.

Detainees arrested in March and April 2008 following clashes in and around the village of Karzakan that had resulted in the death of a National Security Agency officer in disputed circumstances also alleged torture and ill-treatment.  Detainees arrested in December 2008 who were alleged by the authorities to have been trained in the use of explosives and sabotage techniques or to have been recruited by the opposition Haq Movement for Liberty and Democracy to encourage violent unrest also complained of being subjected to torture and ill-treatment.  When they were brought to court medical examinations of a number of detainees found evidence of injuries consistent with the detainees' allegations.

In a letter to Bahrain's Interior Minister Shaikh Rashid bin Abdullah bin Ahmad Al Khalifa, Amnesty International called for an urgent and independent investigation into allegations that, soon after their arrest in December 2008, 13 individuals held incommunicado at the headquarters of the National Security Apparatus in Manama were tortured with electric shocks and beatings and by being suspended by the wrists for long periods. The detainees were reported to have been transferred to the "Dry Dock" Prison (the Ministry of Interior's Short-Term Detention Unit) only after they had made "confessions". Amnesty International called for any officials found responsible for torture or other serious abuses to be brought to justice.

On 11 April 2009, an informal royal "pardon" was granted to 178 detainees whose sentences or trials were suspended. HRW interviewed a number of the released detainees about their treatment in detention and under interrogation (some refused to speak to HRW — human rights and opposition activists claimed that former detainees had been warned against speaking to investigators or the media). Most claimed to have been subjected to torture and ill-treatment at the Ministry of Interior's General Directorate of Criminal Investigation (CID) headquarters in Adliya, in Manama, at the Ministry of Interior's "Dry Dock" Short-Term Detention Unit and possibly at the offices of the NSA.

The Ministry of the Interior and the National Security Agency both report to the Supreme Defense Council, headed by the prime minister and all of whose members are members of the royal family.

In a number of cases prosecutors had failed to record complaints, order medical examinations or investigate allegations, and sometimes returned detainees to the security officers allegedly responsible for the ill treatment.

The Ministry of the Interior and the Public Prosecution Office denied that torture had been used and asserted that the claims had been fabricated. Human Rights Watch found the accounts credible and the medical reports of government doctors and court documents corroborated the allegations. HRW noted that corroboration of torture and ill-treatment by government doctors marked a major improvement from the pre-1999 era of routine torture when few examinations were carried out and doctors were intimidated to prevent them corroborating abuse.

HRW wrote to the Ministry of Justice and the Ministry of the Interior asking detailed questions about government policies concerning torture and ill treatment but received no response. HRW also called on the United States, France, and the United Kingdom, countries with significant security links to Bahrain, to urge the government of Bahrain to take immediate and measurable steps to end the use of torture by its security forces. As France and the United Kingdom provide the NSA and the Ministry of Interior, respectively, with training and assistance they "risk being implicated in prohibited practices and violating their own legal obligations if they cooperate with law enforcement forces they know or should know are employing torture or other ill-treatment."

Torture during Bahraini uprising

Torture during the Bahraini uprising has been described in many human rights reports as being widespread and systematic. 64% of detainees (1866 individuals) reported being tortured. At least five individuals died as a result. During the uprising, detainees were interrogated by three government agencies, the Ministry of Interior, the National Security Agency and the Bahrain Defence Force. According to the Bahrain Independent Commission of Inquiry (BICI) report, physical and psychological abuse was inflicted by the National Security Agency and the Ministry of Interior on a systematic basis and in many cases amounted to torture. The BICI report describes the systematic use of techniques similar to those used during the repression of the 1990s uprising as indicative of "a systemic problem, which can only be addressed on a systemic level."

List of individuals killed under torture in Bahrain
The table below shows the names of some Bahrainis who have died under torture of regime security officers. The list has been compiled from reports documented by Amnesty International and Human Rights Watch.

Footnotes

See also
 Human rights in Bahrain
 Ian Henderson
 Adel Flaifel
 State Security Law of 1974
 1990s Uprising in Bahrain
 History of Bahrain

References

Sections of this article have been taken from the Submission Of THE REDRESS TRUST To The House of Lords meeting On Bahrain, Aug 17 2004

External links
Physicians for Human Rights: Do No Harm: A Call for Bahrain to End Systematic Attacks on Doctors and Patients
 Human Rights Watch: Routine Abuse, Routine Denial: Civil Rights and the Political Crisis in Bahrain

UN Documents
 Conclusions and recommendations of the Committee against Torture: Bahrain
  North South XXI: Submission to the UN Commission on Human Rights
  International Federation of Human Rights Leagues: Submission to UN Commission on Human Rights about Bahrain

 
Political history of Bahrain